Rockbridge County High School is a secondary school in Lexington, Virginia.

History 
Rockbridge County High School was built in 1992 to include all students in Rockbridge County and Lexington, Virginia in grades 9-12.  This school consolidated the former Rockbridge High School, Lexington High School, and Natural Bridge High School.  It is operated by Rockbridge County Public Schools.  The school's mascot is the Wildcat.

Demographics
The demographic breakdown of the 967 students enrolled for the 2017-2018 school year was:
Male - 52.8%
Female - 47.2%
Native American/Alaskan - 0.4%
Asian/Pacific islander - 1.3%
Black - 4.9%
Hispanic - 2.9%
White - 87.8%
Multiracial - 2.7%

In addition, 30.3% of the students were eligible for free or reduced lunch.

Sports 
Rockbridge County High School currently supports 13 Varsity teams including Marching Band, Cheerleading (football and competition), Wrestling, Football, Volleyball, indoor/outdoor Boys' and Girls' track and field, Girls' and Boys' Basketball, Girls' and Boys' Lacrosse, Golf, Swimming, Baseball, Softball, Girls' and Boys' Soccer, Girls' and Boys' Tennis and 8 Junior Varsity teams including Cheerleading, Football, Volleyball, Baseball, Girls' and Boys' Soccer, Softball, Girls' and Boys' Basketball as well as an Academic Team.

Notable alumni
Kelly Evans, CNBC news anchor
Andrew Rowsey, professional basketball player

References

External links
Rockbridge County Public Schools
School website

Public high schools in Virginia
Education in Lexington, Virginia
Schools in Rockbridge County, Virginia
School buildings completed in 1992
Educational institutions established in 1992
1992 establishments in Virginia